The following outline is provided as an overview of and topical guide to baseball:

Baseball – bat-and-ball sport played between two teams of nine players each. The aim is to score runs by hitting a thrown ball with a bat and touching a series of four bases arranged at the corners of a ninety-foot diamond.

What type of thing is baseball? 

 Exercise – bodily activity that enhances or maintains  physical fitness and overall health or wellness.
 Game – structured activity, usually undertaken for enjoyment and sometimes used as an educational tool. Games are distinct from work, which is usually carried out for remuneration, and from art, which is more concerned with the expression of ideas. However, the distinction is not clear-cut, and many games are also considered to be work (such as professional sports).
 Ball game – game played with a ball.
 Bat-and-ball game – field game played by two teams which alternate between "batting" and "fielding" roles. The fielding team defends, so only the batting team may score, but they have equal chances in both roles.
 Sport – form of physical activity which, through casual or organised participation, aim to use, maintain or improve physical fitness and provide entertainment to participants.
 Competitive sport – sport in which one or more participants or teams compete against one another. The one that is the most successful in achieving the objective of the game or sport event is the winner.
 Team sport – sport that involves players working together towards a shared objective.
 Recreational sport – sport engaged in as a leisure time activity.
 Spectator sport – sport that is characterized by the presence of spectators, or watchers, at its matches. Spectator sports are a form of entertainment.
 Professional sport – sport in which the athletes receive payment for their performance.

General baseball concepts

Equipment of the game 
 Baseball bat
 Baseball (ball)
 Baseball glove
 Baseball field
 Batter's eye
 Bullpen
 Infield
 On-deck
 Outfield
 Warning track

Rules of the game 
 Baseball rules
 Balk
 Baseball field
 Baserunning
 Batting out of turn
 Bunt
 Business rules (see The Official Professional Baseball Rules Book)
 Catch
 Defensive substitution
 Designated hitter
 Double switch
 Extra innings
 Fair ball
 Force play
 Forfeit
 Foul ball
 Foul tip
 Fourth out
 Ground rule double
 Ground rules
 Hit
 Hit by pitch
 Home run
 In flight
 Infield fly rule
 Injured list (historically known as "disabled list")
 Inning
 Instant replay in baseball
 Interference
 Invisible runner rule
 Knickerbocker Rules
 Live ball
 Neighborhood play
 Obstruction
 Out
 Pace of play
 Pitch clock
 Pitching position
 Quick pitch
 Rainout
 Run
 Rundown
 Safe
 Strike zone
 Suspended game
 Tag out
 Tag up
 Time of pitch
 Uncaught third strike

History of baseball 
 History of baseball
 Origins of baseball

Baseball leagues, teams, and organizations

National team competitions
 Baseball World Cup
 World Baseball Classic
 WBSC Premier12
 Baseball at the Summer Olympics
 Baseball at the Pan American Games

In North America
 Major League Baseball

 National League
 Atlanta Braves
 Arizona Diamondbacks
 Chicago Cubs
 Cincinnati Reds
 Colorado Rockies
 Los Angeles Dodgers
 Miami Marlins
 Milwaukee Brewers
 New York Mets
 Philadelphia Phillies
 Pittsburgh Pirates
 San Diego Padres
 San Francisco Giants
 St. Louis Cardinals
 Washington Nationals

 American League
 Baltimore Orioles
 Boston Red Sox
 Chicago White Sox
 Cleveland Indians
 Detroit Tigers
 Houston Astros
 Kansas City Royals
 Los Angeles Angels
 Minnesota Twins
 New York Yankees
 Oakland Athletics
 Seattle Mariners
 Tampa Bay Rays
 Texas Rangers
 Toronto Blue Jays

 Minor League Baseball
 see List of Minor League Baseball leagues and teams
 Mexican League
 Winter Leagues
 Colombian Professional Baseball League
 Dominican Winter Baseball League
 Mexican Pacific League
 Puerto Rico Baseball League
 Venezuelan Professional Baseball League
 Amateur baseball in the United States
 All-American Amateur Baseball Association
 National Baseball Congress
 National Adult Baseball Association
 American Legion Baseball
 NCAA Baseball
 American Amateur Baseball Congress
 Pony League
 Little League

Other Latin American Leagues
 Brazilian Baseball Championship
 Pan American Baseball Confederation (COPABE)
 Baseball in Cuba
 Cuba national baseball team
 Cuban National Series
 Nicaraguan Professional Baseball League

Baseball in Europe
 Confederation of European Baseball
 European Cup
 Austrian Baseball League
 Vlaamse Baseball en Softball Liga  (Belgium)
 Ligue Francophone Belge de Baseball-Softball (Belgium)
 Ceskomoravska League (Czech Republic)
 Croatian Baseball League
 Division Élite (France)
 Bundesliga (Germany)
 British Baseball Federation (Great Britain)
 Hellenic Amateur Baseball Federation (Greece)
 Danish Baseball Federation
 Irish Baseball League
 Italian Baseball League
 Honkbal Hoofdklasse (Netherlands)
 Norway Softball and Baseball Federation
 Portuguese Baseball and Softball Federation
 Slovak Baseball Federation (Slovakia)
 División de Honor de Béisbol (Spain)
 Elitserien (Sweden)
 Turkish Baseball Softball American Football and Rugby Federation
 Federation Baseball Softball Ukraine

Baseball in Asia
Nippon Professional Baseball (Japan)

Central League
 Chunichi Dragons
 Hanshin Tigers
 Hiroshima Carp
 Tokyo Yakult Swallows
 Yokohama BayStars
 Yomiuri Giants

Pacific League
 Chiba Lotte Marines
 Fukuoka SoftBank Hawks
 Hokkaido Nippon-Ham Fighters
 Orix Buffaloes
 Saitama Seibu Lions
 Tohoku Rakuten Golden Eagles

 China Baseball League (People's Republic of China)
 Korea Professional Baseball (Korea)
 Baseball Philippines
 Chinese Professional Baseball League (Taiwan)

Baseball in Africa
 African Baseball & Softball Association

Baseball in Oceania
 Australian Baseball League
 New Zealand Baseball

Defunct Leagues
Negro league baseball
 Leagues
 Negro National League (1920–31)
 Eastern Colored League (1923–28)
 American Negro League (1929)
 Negro Southern League (1920–36), minor league
 East-West League (1932)
 Negro National League (1933–48)
 Negro Southern League (1945–51), minor league
 Negro American League (1937–60)
Teams in the Negro leagues

 Former Major Leagues
 American Association (1882–91)
 Union Association (1884)
 Players' League (1890)
 Federal League (1914–15)
 Cuban League
 All-American Girls Professional Baseball League

Baseball publications 

 Baseball America
 Baseball Magazine
 Baseball Digest
 Baseball Hobby News

Persons influential in baseball

Contributors 
 List of members of the Baseball Hall of Fame
 Ford C. Frick Award, presented annually by the Hall of Fame for excellence in baseball broadcasting (article includes a list of honorees)
 BBWAA Career Excellence Award, presented annually by the Baseball Writers' Association of America for excellence in baseball writing (article includes a list of honorees)
 Buck O'Neil Lifetime Achievement Award, presented no more often than every three years by the Hall of Fame for outstanding contributions to baseball's image (article includes a list of honorees)
 People not directly connected with the sport who nevertheless made a contribution:
 Roger Angell, essayist and Spink Award winner
 Ken Burns, documentarian
 Charles Feltman, inventor of the hot dog
 Bill James, author and statistician
 Michael Lewis, author of Moneyball
 Topps Chewing Gum, producer of baseball cards

Players 
 Lists of Major League Baseball players
 List of 19th-century baseball players
 List of Negro league baseball players

Umpires 
 List of Major League Baseball umpires

Managers and Coaches 
 List of Major League Baseball managers by wins
 List of college baseball coaches with 1,100 wins

Owners 
 List of Major League Baseball principal owners

See also 

 Outline of sports

References

External links 

Leagues and organizations
 Major League Baseball
 Minor League Baseball
 British Baseball Federation

Statistics and game records
 Baseball Almanac
 Baseball-Reference.com
 Retrosheet

News and other resources
 BaseballLibrary.com
 Baseball Prospectus
 Society for American Baseball Research
 Baseball PBS documentary directed by Ken Burns
 Mister Baseball European baseball news

Baseball
Baseball